Rajeev Misra is a London-based banker and executive. He is the CEO of SoftBank Investment Advisers which oversees the firm’s Vision Funds.

Early life and education 
Misra was born on the 18th of January 1962 in Balasore, Odisha, India. He attended Delhi Public School at Mathura Road, Delhi, India; studied Chemical Engineering at IIT Delhi; and the University of Pennsylvania (gaining a Bachelor’s in Mechanical Engineering and then a Master of Computer Applications [MCA]). This was followed by a Master of Business Administration (MBA) at the Sloan School of Management at the Massachusetts Institute of Technology (MIT). Misra is a board member of both the University of Pennsylvania and MIT Sloan.

Career 
Misra is Board Director of Softbank Group and CEO of Softbank Investment Advisers. Misra, who leads the team running the company’s Vision Fund, joined SoftBank in 2014. 

Misra spent about 25 years in finance, moving from Merrill Lynch to Deutsche Bank to UBS. At Deutsche Bank, he oversaw a team of credit traders whose bet against the U.S. subprime mortgage market was chronicled in The Big Short. He left Deutsche Bank in June 2008, when he was the global head for credit and commodities and was reportedly earning between 10 and 15 million euros a year. He then worked at the London-based TCI Fund for several months. He joined UBS in 2009, and in May 2014 he was a senior managing partner of Fortress Investment Group, until he joined Softbank in November 2014.

The Wall Street Journal detailed Misra's alleged attempts to undermine his internal rivals at Softbank, including planting stories, filing shareholder complaints, and using a "honey trap".

In July 2022, he stepped back from his executive roles at SoftBank Group to start his own venture fund, as reported by various news agencies. He has secured over $6 billion, including from Middle East investors.

References

Sources
 David Enrich, Dark Towers: Deutsche Bank, Donald Trump, and an Epic Trail of Destruction, Custom House (2020)  - The story of Deutsche Bank and Rajeev's role in it.

Living people
1962 births
SoftBank people
People from Balasore
IIT Delhi alumni
MIT Sloan School of Management alumni
University of Pennsylvania alumni
Deutsche Bank people
UBS people